William Dickey may refer to:

Bill Dickey (1907–1993), catcher for the New York Yankees
William Dickey (diver) (1874–1944), American diver
William Dickey (poet) (1928–1994), American poet
William Bruce Dickey (1842–1902), American businessman and politician
William K. Dickey (1920–2008), American lawyer and politician
William D. Dickey (1845–1924), American soldier and Medal of Honor recipient